The women's shot put event at the 2017 European Athletics U23 Championships was held in Bydgoszcz, Poland, at Zdzisław Krzyszkowiak Stadium on 14 and 15 July.

Medalists

Results

Qualification
15 July

Qualification rule: 14.90 (Q) or the 12 best results (q) qualified for the final.

Final
15 July

References

Shot put
Shot put at the European Athletics U23 Championships